Historically, Buddhism was incorporated into Siberia in the early 17th century. Buddhism is considered to be one of Russia's traditional religions and is legally a part of Russian historical heritage. Besides the historical monastic traditions of Buryatia, Tuva and Kalmykia (the latter being the only Buddhist-majority republic in Europe), the religion of Buddhism is now spreading all over Russia, with many ethnic Russian converts.

The main form of Buddhism in Russia is the Gelukpa school of Tibetan Buddhism, informally known as the "yellow hat" tradition, with other Tibetan and non-Tibetan schools as minorities. Although Tibetan Buddhism is most often associated with Tibet, it spread into Mongolia, and via Mongolia into Siberia before spreading to the rest of Russia.

Datsan Gunzechoinei in Saint Petersburg is the northernmost Buddhist temple in Russia.

History
The first evidence of the existence of Buddhism in the territory of modern Russia (more specifically Siberia, the region nearest East Asia) belongs to the 8th century AD and is associated with the state of Balhae, which in 698–926 occupied part of today's Primorye and Amur. The Mohe, a people whose culture was greatly influenced by neighboring China, Korea and Manchuria, practiced a form of Mahayana Buddhism. It initially spread into those constituent regions of Russia that are geographically or culturally adjacent to Mongolia (the area known as the Mongolian Steppe) or are inhabited by Mongolian ethnic groups: Buryatia, Zabaykalsky Krai, Tuva, and  Kalmykia. The last of these was the only Buddhist region in Europe, located to the north of the Caucasus.

Russian encounter with Buddhism 

From the earliest documented encounters with Buddhism and Buddhists, Russians had mainly negative impressions about the faith and their adherents. Conservative secular Russians and Christians regularly lambasted Buddhism, seeing it as a roadblock to the Christianization and Russification of Siberia. Russian thinkers saw Buddhism as a superstitious but advanced religion espousing the opposite of a rational and scientific worldview. Views of Buddhism for the Russians were molded more by the polemics of Christian missionaries and geopolitics than by the academic world.

When the Cossacks first encountered Buddhism (in its Tibetan form) during their conquest of Siberia, they characterized Buddhism as a form of paganism. Early Russian explorers and Christian missionaries described Tibetan Buddhism as a "superstition", "false creed", or "idolatry" among other similar labels. Russian Christian literature regularly referred to Buddhist temples or monasteries as pagan shrines. Buddhist religious services were denounced as witchcraft, quackery or "shamanic orgies".

Throughout the 19th and early 20th century, Russian researchers began studying Tibetan Buddhism. However, because of Orientalism and the frequent Christian or missionary background of the scholars, their works are not considered academic in modern times, with many scholars of the time assuming that Buddhism was defective and utilizing little textual material to enforce their biases. With the advent of Buddhist studies in western Europe in the 19th century, Russian society was similarly exposed to the idea that Buddhism contained an impressive philosophy and history. However, Russian elites and academics saw true Buddhism a religion of the past or existing in certain regions like Sri Lanka. Siberian Buddhism was seen as backward throughout the 19th and early 20th century. In the late 19th century and early 20th century, parts of Russian society began having positive views of Tibetan Buddhism but advocating for the Europeanization of Buddhism and closer incorporation of Buddhists in an effort to "civilize" them.

19th century to present 

By 1887, there were 29 publishing houses and numerous datsans. In 1917 these ethnic regions had among them approximately 20,000 Buddhists and 175 temples.

When the Soviet Union came into being, all religions including Buddhism began to be viewed as "tools of oppression", and Buddhists in positions of authority were looked upon unfavourably. By 1917, Joseph Stalin had ensured that no datsans  remained open in the country. The USSR sought to remove Buddhism and other religions, as they believed that a lack of religion combined with urbanization would result in an increase in production. In 1929 many monasteries were closed down and monks were arrested and exiled. By the 1930s, Buddhists were suffering more than any other religious community in the Soviet Union with lamas being expelled and accused of being "Japanese spies" and "the people's enemies". In 1943 all Kalmykians were forcibly exiled to Siberia due to government suspicions that they were collaborating with Nazi Germany when it had occupied part of Kalmykia. About 40% of the Kalmykian population died while in exile and those who did survive were not able to return to their homeland until 1956.

However, Buddhism did not disappear from Russia as a result of the efforts of Bidia Dandaron, a follower of Tsydenov and a famous Buddhologist and thinker. Dandaron attempted to revive Buddhism in the atheist state by introducing the concept of Neo-Buddhism, a combination of Buddhist teachings and contemporary Western philosophy with scientific theories. Dandaron was later arrested for creating a religious community and eventually died in a prison camp. Nevertheless, his disciples played a key role in the 1990s with the revival of Russian Buddhism.

Revival

After the fall of the Soviet Union, a Buddhist revival began in Kalmykia with the election of President Kirsan Ilyumzhinov. It was also revived in Buryatia and Tuva and began to spread to Russians in other regions.

In 1992, the Dalai Lama made his first visit to Tuva in Russia.

There are several Tibetan Buddhist university-monasteries throughout Russia, concentrated in Siberia, known as datsans.

Fyodor Shcherbatskoy, a renowned Russian Indologist who traveled to India and Mongolia during the time of the Russian Empire, is widely considered by many to be responsible for laying the foundations for the study of Buddhism in the Western world.

There are now between 700,000 and 1.5 million Buddhists in Russia, mainly in the republics of Buryatia, Kalmykia and Tuva.

Regions with large Buddhist populations

In 2012 Buddhism was the religion of 62% of the total population of Tuva, 48% of Kalmykia and 20% of Buryatia. Buddhism also has believers amounting to 6% in Zabaykalsky Krai, primarily ethnic Buryats, and 0.5% to 0.9% in Tomsk Oblast and Yakutia. Buddhist communities may be found in other federal subjects of Russia, between 0.1% and 0.5% in Sakhalin Oblast, Khabarovsk Krai, Amur Oblast, Irkutsk Oblast, Altay, Khakassia, Novosibirsk Oblast, Tomsk Oblast, Tyumen Oblast, Orenburg Oblast, Arkhangelsk Oblast, Murmansk Oblast, Moscow and Moscow Oblast, Saint Petersburg and Leningrad Oblast, and in Kaliningrad Oblast. In cities like Moscow, Saint Petersburg and Samara, often up to 1% of the population identify as Buddhists.

See also
Buddhism in Buryatia
Buddhism in Tuva
Buddhism in Kalmykia
Datsan and Khurul - Buddhist temples in Russia
Datsan Gunzechoinei
Khambo Lama
Tubden Shedubling - Buddhist temple complex in Moscow

References

Bibliography
 
 
 Ulanov, Mergen; Badmaev, Valeriy and Holland, Edward (2017). Buddhism and Kalmyk Secular Law in the Seventeenth to Nineteenth Centuries, Inner Asia 19(2), 297–314
 Terentyev, Andrey (Autumn 1996). Tibetan Buddhism in Russia, The Tibet Journal 21 (3), pp. 60–70

External links
The Buddhist hordes of Kalmykia, The Guardian September 19, 2006
Buddhactivity Dharma Centres database 
  Gusinoye Ozero, seat of imperial Russia's Buddhists
 Buddhist Paintings in Buryatia
  History of Tibetan Buddhism in Inner Asia in the 20th Century
 Buryats culture and traditions
  Pandito Khambo Lama Itigelov's Most Precious Body 10/9/05)

 
Religion in Russia
Russia
Rus
Rus
Russia